Flavius Studius (fl. 5th century) was a statesman of the Eastern Roman Empire.

He served as consul in 454 together with Flavius Aetius, and in 464 he was raised to the rank of patricius.

He was a devout Christian and in 463 in Constantinople founded Saint John the Forerunner monastery – Studion.

References

5th-century Byzantine people
5th-century Roman consuls
Imperial Roman consuls
Patricii
Founders of Christian monasteries